Mirville is a commune in the Seine-Maritime department in the Normandy region in northern France.

Geography

Population

Places of interest
 The sixteenth-century chateau de Mirville.
 The church of St.Quentin, dating from the thirteenth century.
 A feudal motte (eleventh century).
 The nineteenth century railway viaduct, built in 1844 : 524m in length with 49 arches, the highest of which is 35m.

See also
Communes of the Seine-Maritime department

References

Communes of Seine-Maritime